{{safesubst:#invoke:RfD|||month = March
|day = 10
|year = 2023
|time = 23:02
|timestamp = 20230310230237

|content=
REDIRECTLee Myung-bak

}}